The Porsche GT3 Cup Challenge Australia is a sports car racing series open to drivers of Porsche 911 GT3 Cup cars. The series was first held in 2008 to fill the void between club racing and the Australian Carrera Cup Championship and Australian GT Championship for Porsche owners. The series primarily consists of Type 996 and Type 997 Porsche 911 GT3 Cup cars, with each model competing in a different class, though other models are eligible to compete.

The series runs on the Shannons Nationals Motor Racing Championships calendar, holding five rounds each year.

Series winners

References

External links
 Porsche GT3 Cup Challenge Australia

 
Auto racing series in Australia
2008 establishments in Australia
Sports leagues established in 2008